Clarice Ahanotu (born 27 July 1939) is a Nigerian sprinter. She competed in the women's 100 metres at the 1964 Summer Olympics.

References

External links

1939 births
Living people
Athletes (track and field) at the 1964 Summer Olympics
Nigerian female sprinters
Olympic athletes of Nigeria
Place of birth missing (living people)
Olympic female sprinters
20th-century Nigerian women